Matthew James or Mathew James may refer to:
Mathew James (umpire) (born 1974), Australian rules football umpire
Matthew James (actor) (born 1973), American actor
Matthew James (politician) (born 1955), American politician from Virginia
Matty James (Matthew Lee James, born 1991), English footballer for Leicester City
Matthew C. James (1857/58–1934),  marine architect, poet and songwriter from Walker, Newcastle upon Tyne

See also
Matt James (disambiguation)